Jussi Makkonen (born April 24, 1985) is a Finnish professional ice hockey forward who currently plays for Porin Ässät in the Finnish Liiga.

Awards
 Aarne Honkavaara award (Best goalscorer in SM-liiga), 2008–2009

References

External links

1985 births
Living people
Espoo Blues players
Finnish ice hockey forwards
Frölunda HC players
HC Dinamo Minsk players
HPK players
JYP Jyväskylä players
Tappara players
HC TPS players
TuTo players
Sportspeople from Turku